Thomas Edward "Tom" Danson Jr. (December 17, 1933 – July 31, 2016) was an American politician in the state of Florida.

Danson was born in Jacksonville, and attended the University of Florida. He was an insurance agent. He served in the Florida House of Representatives for the 73rd and 69th (the latter in his last term) district from 1976 to 1984, as a Republican. He died on July 31, 2016.

References

2016 deaths
1933 births
Republican Party members of the Florida House of Representatives
People from Jacksonville, Florida